Najafabad (also Romanized as Najafābād; also known as Dar Eshkaft (Persian: دراشكفت) and Darreh Eshgoft) is a village in Tarom Rural District, in the Central District of Hajjiabad County, Hormozgan Province, Iran. In the 2006 census, its population was 33 people, in 7 families.

References 

Populated places in Hajjiabad County